Preet may refer to:

Given name
 Preet Bharara (born 1968), American lawyer, author, and former federal prosecutor who served as the United States Attorney for the Southern District of New York from 2009 to 2017
 Preet Brar, Punjabi musician
 Preet Gill (born 1972), British Labour Co-op politician, MP for Birmingham Edgbaston since 2017
 Preet Kaur Madhan, Indian television actress

Location 
 Preet Vihar, residential colony and administrative subdivision of the East Delhi district in India

Television program 
 Preet Na Kariyo Koi, 2015 Pakistani romantic comedy drama serial on Hum TV